Baoziwan railway station is a station on the Beijing–Baotou railway located in Xinrong District, Datong, Shanxi. It is the last station in Shanxi travelling westbound toward Baotou, Inner Mongolia.

See also
 List of stations on Jingbao railway

Railway stations in Shanxi